Springfield Park was a multi-purpose stadium in Wigan, Greater Manchester. It was the home ground of Wigan Athletic F.C. until the club moved to the new JJB Stadium (now DW Stadium) after the 1998–99 season. At its largest, the stadium held 40,000.  In its 102-year existence the ground only saw 32 years as a Football League venue, 11 years for Wigan Borough F.C. and 21 years for Wigan Athletic FC, before it was demolished to make way for a housing estate in 1999.

The stadium had previously been home to Wigan County, Wigan United, Wigan Town, and Wigan Borough (previously Wigan United and Wigan Association) as well as Wigan and Springfield Borough rugby league sides. It was also used for horse trotting, as a track cycling velodrome, for wrestling and for athletics.

Springfield Park was designed by architect Richardson Thomas Johnson and built in 1897 at a cost of £16,000. It was owned by The Wigan Trotting and Athletic Grounds Company Ltd. The first professional football match at the stadium took place in September 1897 when Wigan County played Burton Swifts in a friendly match.

Association Football

History
Wigan County were the first team to play at Springfield Park. Their greatest event was a 1–0 loss at the hands of Manchester City before their liquidation and extinction three years after their 1897 formation. Wigan United took the lease at Springfield Park in 1901, competing for two seasons in the Lancashire League. After being drawn away to Stalybridge Rovers in the third round of the Rawcliffe Cup, they declined to play due to a waterlogged pitch. However, the referee ruled otherwise, leaving Stalybridge to kick off, dribble and place the ball into the net. Wigan Town was the third attempt to establish football in Wigan in 1905, but it too failed to survive for more than three years.

After a period of inactivity at Springfield Park due to the First World War, Wigan United beat Fleetwood 2–0 on 6 September 1919 in the West Lancs League. This was the first official game after the war and would lead to the club taking the lease for the ground on 2 December 1919 for the rest of the season. United eventually became Wigan Borough F.C. in 1920 and became one of the founder members of the Football League Third Division North. They won their first game, against Nelson, 2–1 in front of 9,000 spectators. The club's best performance was in 1928–29 when they reached the Third round of the FA Cup. This was to be the largest attendance ever recorded at Springfield Park, with 30,443 spectators watching a 3–1 loss to Sheffield Wednesday.

Wigan Borough resigned from the football league during the 1931–32 season. Shortly after Borough went out of business, a new club, Wigan Athletic F.C., was formed and continued to play their home games at Springfield Park. After lengthy negotiations, Wigan Athletic purchased the ground from the owner of Woodhouse Lane Stadium for £2,800 with the proviso that greyhound racing never take place at Springfield Park.

During the 1952–53 season, the main stand was razed to the ground by fire, resulting in major fundraising efforts for the construction of a new stand. The following season, a record crowd of 27,526 watched Wigan Athletic beat Hereford United 4–1. To this day, it is the largest attendance ever recorded between two non-league clubs excluding Wembley finals.

19 October 1966 marked the first floodlit match at Springfield Park, when Wigan Athletic played Crewe Alexandra. This was a full year before floodlights were installed at Central Park.

In October 1978, Zambia –coached by Brian Tiler, himself an ex-Latics manager– became the first national team to play at Springfield Park. Wigan won the game 2–1.

Wigan Athletic F.C. moved to the new JJB Stadium after the 1999 season. The final competitive goal to be scored at the stadium was by Manchester City's Paul Dickov.

Attendances

Wigan Borough

Football League
 Stockport County, 1 April 1929. Division 3 North: 15,162
 Accrington Stanley, 14 October 1922. Division 3 North: 13,000
 Rochdale, 27 August 1923. Division 3 North: 13,000
 Bradford City, 1 September 1928. Division 3 North: 12,646

Other
 Sheffield Wednesday, 12 January 1929. FA Cup Round 3: 30,433

Wigan Athletic

Football League
 Bolton Wanderers, 26 December 1983. Division 3: 10,045
 Plymouth Argyle, 19 April 1986. Division 3: 9,485
 Barnsley, 3 March 1979. Division 4: 9,427

Other
 Hereford United, 1953–54. FA Cup Round 2: 27,526 (record attendance for a match between two non-league teams at a non-league ground)
 Newcastle United, 1953–54. FA Cup Round 3: 26,500
 Millwall, 1934–35. FA Cup Round 3: 25,304

Neutral Venue
 Newcastle United -v- Cardiff City, 2 October 1922. Whitehaven Pit Disaster Fund: 15,000

Rugby League
Wigan Rugby League team became sub-tenants of Springfield Park (which they shared with Wigan United who had playing preference) playing their first game there on 14 September 1901. A crowd of 4,123 saw them beat Morecambe 12–0. Wigan rugby league team's record crowd at Springfield was 10,111 when they beat Widnes on 19 March 1902. The last game was on 28 April 1902 when Wigan beat the Rest of Lancashire Senior Competition. Wigan then moved to Central Park.

The only other rugby league team to play at the ground was Springfield Borough who played at Springfield Park for one season in 1987–88. A continuation of Springfield Borough still play under the guise of Blackpool Panthers in League 1.

Cycling
It was used regularly for competitions; local racing cyclists who raced there included Benjamin Jones, who competed in the 1908 London Olympic Games winning two gold medals.

References

External links
 
 Ultimate Wigan Athletic Website
 The Springfield Park Memorial
 Wigan Borough Football Club – Complete
 Wigan Athletic official website
 Wigan Town A.F.C.

Defunct football venues in England
Defunct rugby league venues in England
Defunct velodromes in the United Kingdom
Multi-purpose stadiums in the United Kingdom
Defunct sports venues in Greater Manchester
1897 establishments in England
1999 disestablishments in England
Sports venues completed in 1897
Sports venues demolished in 1999
Demolished buildings and structures in Greater Manchester
Sport in Wigan
English Football League venues
Demolished sports venues in the United Kingdom
Buildings and structures in Wigan